Delmar Drew Arnaud (born May 25, 1973), known professionally as Daz Dillinger or simply Daz (formerly Dat Nigga Daz), is an American rapper and record producer. In the 1990s at Death Row Records, aided the catapult of West Coast rap and gangsta rap into the mainstream. He is one half of the rap duo tha Dogg Pound, along with Kurupt.

Daz learned production from Dr. Dre in working on Dre's debut solo album, The Chronic, in 1992. Daz did more on Snoop Dogg's debut solo album Doggystyle in 1993, and secured his production standing on 2Pac's All Eyez on Me in 1996. Since leaving Death Row around 2000, Daz has focused on his own releases through his D.P.G. Recordz.

Career

Start at Death Row 
A younger cousin of rapper Snoop Dogg, likewise from Long Beach, California, Daz began his career at about age 19 with Death Row Records, cofounded by Marion "Suge" Knight, where Daz learned music production from Dr. Dre. Signed to the label at age 19, both producing and rapping, Daz worked with Dr. Dre on West Coast rap's breakthrough album, The Chronic. Meanwhile, befriending rapper Kurupt, who also rapped on The Chronic, the two formed a rap duo, Tha Dogg Pound.

The Dogg Pound appeared on Snoop Dogg's debut solo album, too, the cultural landmark Doggystyle, released as Death Row's second album on November 23, 1993. Daz, in particular, was more involved in Doggystyle's production. Daz was featured on one track and received co-production credit on two, "Serial Killa" and "For All My Niggaz & Bitches", although Daz contributed more production work, albeit not being officially credited. In the meantime, Daz produced tracks for the movie soundtracks Above The Rim as well as Murder Was the Case.

In their single "What Would You Do?", Tha Dogg Pound sided with Dr. Dre against his former N.W.A groupmate Eazy-E and his Ruthless Records. Later, amid the rap genre's East Coast–West Coast rivalry then ongoing and escalating, Tha Dogg Pound jumped in for the West, specifically the Los Angeles area, by releasing the single "New York, New York", featuring Snoop, which slighted the city. (Responding, the rap duo Capone-N-Noreaga, from the city's borough Queens, released "L.A., L.A.", featuring Mobb Deep and Tragedy Khadafi.) Subsequently, Tha Dogg Pound's debut album, Dogg Food, met rave reviews and platinum sales.

Growth at Death Row Records 
In 1996, as both the East–West rap rivalry and Suge Knight's violent tactics in house intensified, Death Row's lead producer Dr. Dre increasingly distanced himself from the studio's toxic atmosphere. Starting with Tha Dogg Pound's debut album Dogg Food, produced by Daz, Dre ceased producing entire albums with Death Row. Eventually working there only with 2Pac, Dre produced just three tracks—"California Love", "California Love (Remix)", and "Can't C Me"—on 2Pac's first Death Row album, All Eyez on Me.

Daz, on the other hand, produced five songs on All Eyez on Me—"Ambitionz Az A Ridah", "2 of Amerikaz Most Wanted", "I Ain't Mad At Cha", "Skandalouz", and "Got My Mind Made Up"—which rapidly became 2Pac's most commercially successful album, solidifying Daz's standing as a producer. Effectively Death Row's lead producer by then, Daz also helped on Snoop Dogg's second album, Tha Doggfather, which recorded from February to October 1996. In March, Dre left Death Row to form his own record label, Aftermath Entertainment,.

The murder of 2Pac in September 1996 and Suge's parole violations incurring his prison sentence of nine years in 1997 spurred an exodus of artists from Death Row. From 1997 to early 1998, Nate Dogg, Snoop, and Kurupt left Death Row, leaving the label's only remaining platinum seller as Tha Dogg Pound member Daz, who meanwhile contributed production to Nate Dogg's debut studio album, released by his own newly formed label, to the Lady of Rage's only studio album, and to the Gridlock'd soundtrack. Soon, Death Row released Daz's debut solo album, Retaliation, Revenge and Get Back. Even after he left Death Row nearing 2000, his production appeared on the unauthorized Snoop compilation Dead Man Walkin', leaked by Suge Knight in 2001.

D.P.G. Recordz and indie releases 
After leaving Death Row Records, Daz would produce for artists like Kurupt, Soopafly, and B-Legit. In 2000, Daz's second solo album, R.A.W., was released by his own label, D.P.G. Recordz. In the following years, Daz has continued to focus on his own, indie releases and sales.

In 2001, while Death Row still owned the duo's original name, Daz and Kurupt reappeared, if under the name D.P.G., with a second album, Dillinger & Young Gotti, which received mixed reviews. But Kurupt soon signed with Death Row again, prompting Daz to repeatedly smear him in songs and interviews.

While feuding with Kurupt from 2002 to 2005—as in Daz's songs "Catch U in the Club" and "U Ain't Shit", plus his skit "A Message to Ricardo Brown", drawing Kurupt's response "No Vaseline Part 2"—Daz released a few solo albums, if one with a makeshift group, DPGC, including Snoop Dogg, Soopafly, and Bad Azz.

In 2005, Snoop hosted a West Coast unity event, where Daz and Kurupt reconciled. While gaining rights to their original name, Tha Dogg Pound, Kurupt left Death Row again, and Daz closed his brief time at Jermaine Dupri's So So Def Recordings. Over the years since then, Tha Dogg Pound has released a few more albums.

In 2020 Daz united with Queens MC Capone one half of Capone-N-Norega for a collaborative album entitled "Guidelines" under Empire Distribution

Discography

Solo studio albums 
 Retaliation, Revenge and Get Back (1998)
 R.A.W. (2000)
 This Is the Life I Lead (2002)
 DPGC: U Know What I'm Throwin' Up (2003)
 I Got Love in These Streetz (2004)
 Tha Dogg Pound Gangsta LP (2005)
 Gangsta Crunk (2005)
 So So Gangsta (2006)
 Gangsta Party (2007)
 Only on the Left Side (2008)
 Public Enemiez (2009)
 Matter of Dayz (2010)
 D.A.Z. (2011)
 Witit Witit (2012)
 Weed Money (2014)
 Dazamataz (2018)
 Smoke Me Out (2018)

Collaboration albums 
 Long Beach 2 Fillmoe with JT the Bigga Figga (2001)
 Game for Sale with JT the Bigga Figga (2001)
 Don't Go 2 Sleep with Makaveli (2001)
 Southwest with Nuwine (2003)
 Get That Paper with Fratthouse (2009)
 West Coast Gangsta Shit with WC (2013)
 Cuzznz with Snoop Dogg (2016)
 A.T.L.A. with Big Gipp (2020)

Awards 
 Nominated in 1996 Grammy Award for Best Rap Performance by a Duo or Group (with Kurupt): "What Would You Do"

References

External links 
 Instagram
 

1973 births
Living people
21st-century American male musicians
21st-century American rappers
African-American male rappers
African-American record producers
American hip hop record producers
Crips
Death Row Records artists
MNRK Music Group artists
Gangsta rappers
G-funk artists
Musicians from Long Beach, California
Place of birth missing (living people)
Priority Records artists
Rappers from Los Angeles
Record producers from California
So So Def Recordings artists
Virgin Records artists
West Coast hip hop musicians